A pimple is a swollen spot on the skin.

Pimple may also refer to:

The Pimple, a mountain in Antarctica
Pimple Creek, a river in Florida
Pimple Hill, a summit in Pennsylvania
Pimple Hills, a mountain range in New Jersey
Pimple (film series), a series of short silent films featuring the British comedian Fred Evans